ARTS may refer to:
 Active Real-time Tracing System, a technology improving programme reception in FM tuners by Pioneer
 Alpha Repertory Television Service, one of the predecessors that formed the A&E Network
 aRts, analog real time synthesizer, an audio component of the KDE desktop environment
 National Foundation for Advancement in the Arts, their program known formerly as the Arts Recognition and Talent Search
 Association for Retail Technology Standards program
 Pasadena Area Rapid Transit System, the Pasadena, CA bus system known as Pasadena ARTS
 ARTS-Dance, the Alliance of Round, Traditional and Square-Dance, Inc.
 Atmospheric Radiative Transfer Simulator, radiative transfer model 
 Automated Radar Terminal System, also known as Common ARTS, an air traffic control computer system
 Action real-time strategy, a term for the video game subgenre, multiplayer online battle arena
 Classic Arts Showcase
 Tenille Arts (born 1994) Canadian country musician

See also 

Art (given name), the name
ART (disambiguation), the three letter acronym
Art (disambiguation), the word